Mama Khel is a town and union council in Lakki Marwat District of Khyber-Pakhtunkhwa. It is located at 32°51'1N 70°46'51E and has an altitude of 280 metres (921 feet).

References

Union councils of Lakki Marwat District
Populated places in Lakki Marwat District